The ambassador of Great Britain to Denmark was the foremost diplomatic representative in Denmark (also referred to as the kingdoms of Denmark and Norway) of the Kingdom of Great Britain, a European state created by the Treaty of Union of 1707, in charge of the British diplomatic mission to Copenhagen.

For ambassadors from the Court of St James's to Denmark before 1707 see List of ambassadors of the Kingdom of England to Denmark. For ambassadors after 1800, see List of ambassadors of the United Kingdom to Denmark.

Envoys Extraordinary of Great Britain to Denmark
1706—1715 Daniel Pulteney
1715—1721: Alexander Hume-Campbell, but Ambassador 1720—1721
1721—1729: John Campbell, Lord Glenorchy
1727: Admiral Sir John Norris
1729: Brigadier Richard Sutton Special military mission
1730—1768: Walter Titley Secretary in charge of affairs 1729-30; Minister Resident 1730—1739; then Envoy Extraordinary
1763—1765: Dudley Alexander Sydney Cosby Minister Resident
1766—1771: Robert Gunning Minister Resident 1766; then Envoy Extraordinary
1771—1772: Robert Murray Keith (the younger)
1772—1773: Ralph Woodford
1773—1779: Daniel de Laval Minister Resident 1774—1778; then Envoy Extraordinary
1779—1783: Morton Eden
1783—1789: Hugh Elliot
1789—1790: J. Johnstone
1790: George Hammond Chargé d'Affaires
1790—1792: Francis Drake Chargé d'Affaires
1792—1794: Daniel Hailes
1794—1796: James Craufurd Chargé d'Affaires
1796—1800: Lord Robert FitzGerald
1800: Charles Whitworth, 1st Baron Whitworth Plenipotentiary on Extraordinary Mission
1800—1801: William Drumond Chargé d'Affaires

References

Denmark
Great Britain